Portsea may refer to:
 Portsea, Victoria, a seaside town in Australia
 Portsea Island, an island on the south coast of England contained within the city of Portsmouth
 Portsea, Portsmouth, a parish and informal area of the city

See also